Kilian Island formerly Elvira Island is an uninhabited island in the Qikiqtaaluk Region, Nunavut, Canada. It is located in the Viscount Melville Sound, west of Stefansson Island, and north of Victoria Island.

It is named for Bernhard Kilian, chief engineer of the Polar Bear who tried to salvage the burning ship Elvira in September 1913 when the two schooners (the Polar Bear and the Elvira) were frozen in the ice of the Beaufort Sea, along with two ships belonging to Rudolph Martin Anderson's southern team of the Vilhjalmur Stefansson's Canadian Arctic Expedition, 1913–1916.

References

 Polar Bear Voyage, 1913-14

External links 
 Kilian Island in the Atlas of Canada - Toporama; Natural Resources Canada

Uninhabited islands of Qikiqtaaluk Region